Louis Delmas (born April 12, 1987) is a former American football safety. He was drafted by the Detroit Lions in the second round of the 2009 NFL Draft. He played college football at Western Michigan. He was also a member of the Miami Dolphins.

Early years
Delmas is of Haitian descent. He was born in Delmas, a commune in the Port-au-Prince area in Haiti, on a street named Delmas 25 and moved to Miami, Florida at age 11. When he first arrived he did not speak any English.

High school career
Delmas played high school football at North Miami Beach High School in North Miami Beach, Florida.

College career

Delmas played college football at Western Michigan from 2005 to 2008. The Broncos made the 2008 Texas Bowl in his senior year but lost to Rice 38–14. Delmas was named to the All-MAC Defensive First-team in 2008 and played in the 2009 Senior Bowl All-Star game.

Professional career

2009 NFL Draft
Delmas was considered by some to be a top-10 prospect at his position in the 2009 NFL Draft. In 2008, ESPN's Todd McShay said Delmas had a chance to get drafted in the first three rounds.

Detroit Lions
The Detroit Lions selected Delmas in the second round (33rd overall) of the 2009 NFL Draft. He was the first safety drafted in 2009.

He was signed by the Lions to a four-year contract. Delmas returned a 65-yard fumble for a touchdown in Week 1 of the 2009 season against the New Orleans Saints. Delmas won September's rookie defensive player of the month award. On December 20, 2009, Delmas became the first rookie in NFL history to record an interception return for a touchdown, a fumble return for a touchdown and a safety in the same season. He is only the second player in NFL history to accomplish the feats in the same season. He was named 2009 Detroit Lions Rookie of the Year in voting by the Detroit Sports Broadcasters Association.

Delmas was named a Pro Bowl alternate for the NFC after the 2010 NFL season.

Delmas was named a Pro Bowl alternate for the NFC after the 2011 NFL season, despite missing five games to injuries.

On March 15, 2013, Delmas re-signed with the Lions to a two-year contract worth $9.465 million.

On October 6, 2013, Lions' center Dominic Raiola was involved in an incident of trash-talking and hate speech to members of the UW-Madison marching band. Delmas was credited with both apologizing for his teammate's actions and having a word with Raiola off the field.

Delmas was released on February 13, 2014.

Miami Dolphins
On March 10, 2014, Delmas signed a one-year deal with the Miami Dolphins. The contract is worth a maximum of $3.5 million. He wore number 25, honoring the street name he was born on in Haiti. On December 8, 2014, he was placed on Injured reserve after he tore his right ACL against the Baltimore Ravens.

He was resigned by the Dolphins on March 20, 2015.

NFL statistics

Personal life
On April 4, 2017, it was reported that Delmas had been arrested by the Miami-Dade Police for resisting arrest without violence. Delmas was a passenger in a vehicle that was pulled over for speeding 76 MPH in a 40 MPH speed limit zone. The driver, Andry Madrigal, was suspected of driving under the influence and failed sobriety test on the scene. A breath sample that was subsequently taken at the station measured 0.164, which is twice the legal 0.08 limit. Delmas continued to yell while the police officers conducted the field sobriety tests and was arrested after ignoring multiple requests. He was processed at the Miami-Dade Police station before posting a $500 bond.

References

External links
Western Michigan Broncos bio
Detroit Lions: Louis Delmas

1987 births
Living people
Haitian emigrants to the United States
People from Port-au-Prince
People from Fort Pierce, Florida
American football safeties
Players of American football from Florida
Western Michigan Broncos football players
Detroit Lions players
Miami Dolphins players